The Dance Suite for Brass Quintet (1989) is the last work completed by the American conductor and composer Leonard Bernstein. It consists of five short movements, each dedicated to a friend.

Instrumentation
2 trumpets, 1 French horn, 1 trombone, 1 tuba.

Movements
 "Dancisca for Anthony"
 "Waltz for Agnes"
 "Bi-Tango for Mischa"
 "Two-Step for Mr. B"
 "MTV for Jerry"

Creation
The suite was the last composition that Bernstein completed. It was originally intended to be accompanied by dance, but the choreographer abandoned the idea.

Premiere
The suite was premiered on January 14, 1990 at the Metropolitan Opera House, New York City, by the Empire Brass Quintet and American Ballet Theatre. The first movement was doubled by the ballet's orchestra in the pit.

Sources
 Gottlieb, Jack: Working With Bernstein, p. 194-6.

Compositions by Leonard Bernstein
1989 compositions
Chamber music compositions
20th-century classical music